The Ginn Gardener's House is a historic house in Winchester, Massachusetts.  It is one of two surviving outbuildings (the other is the carriage house) of the extensive "Terrace of Oaks" estate of publisher Edwin Ginn, whose main house was demolished in 1946.  The two-story brick gardener's house, built in 1900, shows the high quality of the estate and its Georgian Revival character.  Its brickwork is laid in Flemish bond, with a water table and trim elements of marble.  The five-bay facade has a center entry, which is sheltered by a square portico, supported by Tuscan columns and topped by a low railing with turned balusters.  Above the entry is a shallow gable, below which is a large round-arch window.

The house was listed on the National Register of Historic Places in 1989.

See also
National Register of Historic Places listings in Winchester, Massachusetts

References

Houses on the National Register of Historic Places in Winchester, Massachusetts
Houses in Winchester, Massachusetts